The  is a professional wrestling championship owned by the New Japan Pro-Wrestling (NJPW) promotion.

The title was announced on December 21, 2015, with the first champions crowned on January 4, 2016. Through NJPW's relationship with Ring of Honor (ROH), the title has also been defended in the American promotion. The championship is contested for by teams of three wrestlers and is the first title of its kind in the history of NJPW. The title's openweight nature means that both heavyweight and junior heavyweight wrestlers are eligible to challenge for it.

Like most professional wrestling championships, the title is won as a result of a match with a predetermined outcome. There have been twenty-two reigns shared among seventeen teams and thirty-one wrestlers.

History
On December 11, 2015, NJPW announced that at Wrestle Kingdom 10 in Tokyo Dome on January 4, 2016, the Bullet Club trio of Bad Luck Fale, Tama Tonga and Yujiro Takahashi would take on Toru Yano and two mystery partners. Eight days later, Yano revealed his partners as the Ring of Honor (ROH) tag team The Briscoe Brothers (Jay Briscoe and Mark Briscoe). On December 21, NJPW added that the match would be for the newly created NEVER Openweight 6-Man Tag Team Championship, the promotion's first six-man title. The title's name carried the acronym NEVER, which stood for "New Blood", "Evolution", "Valiantly", "Eternal", and "Radical" and was a NJPW-promoted series of events that ran from 2010 to 2012 and featured younger up-and-coming talent and outside wrestlers not signed to the promotion. This is the second title to carry the NEVER name, after the NEVER Openweight Championship, which was introduced in November 2012.

On January 4, 2016, Toru Yano and The Briscoe Brothers defeated Bad Luck Fale, Tama Tonga and Yujiro Takahashi to become the inaugural champions. After losing the title to Fale, Tonga and Takahashi on February 11 at The New Beginning in Osaka, Yano and The Briscoe Brothers also became the first two-time winners of the title, when they regained it three days later at The New Beginning in Niigata. Later that month, the title was defended outside Japan for the first time, when new champions Kenny Omega and The Young Bucks (Matt Jackson and Nick Jackson) successfully defended it against A. C. H., Kushida and Matt Sydal at ROH's 14th Anniversary Show in Las Vegas, Nevada. On September 25, 2016, the title was vacated for the first time due to one of the champions, Matt Sydal, failing to make it to a scheduled championship defense because of "travel issues". NJPW crowned new champions that same day.

On January 4, 2017, at Wrestle Kingdom 11 in Tokyo Dome, the Los Ingobernables de Japón (L.I.J.) trio of Bushi, Evil and Sanada won a four-team gauntlet match to capture the title for the first time. They then began exchanging the title with members of the Taguchi Japan stable, resulting in them becoming record three-time champions on May 3 at Wrestling Dontaku 2017. During its first 20 months of existence, the title changed hands 12 times, with no championship team successfully defending it more than two times until L.I.J.'s record-breaking third title reign. The title was also slotted on the undercards of NJPW events and some championship matches took place as early as the second match on a seven-match show with no other title matches. Bushi publicly criticized NJPW's handling of the title, claiming that the booking was costing the title credibility. L.I.J.'s record-setting reign ended on December 17, 2017, when they were defeated by Bullet Club's Bad Luck Fale, Tama Tonga and Tanga Loa in their fourth defense.

Reigns

There have been 25 reigns shared among 35 wrestlers and 19 teams with 2 vacancies. Chaos (Jay Briscoe, Mark Briscoe and Toru Yano) were the first champions in the title's history. Chaos (Hirooki Goto, Tomohiro Ishii and Yoshi-Hashi) hold the record for the longest reign and most defenses in an individual reign , while Los Ingobernables de Japón (Bushi, Evil and Sanada) hold the record for the shortest reign in the title's history, with their first reign of one day being the shortest. They also hold the record for most reigns as a team with three. Individually, Evil holds the record for five reigns.

References

External links
Official title history at NJPW.co.jp
Title history at Wrestling-Titles.com

New Japan Pro-Wrestling championships
Openweight wrestling championships
Trios wrestling tag team championships